Modest Cuixart i Tàpies (born 2 November 1925 in Barcelona – died 31 October 2007 in Palamós) was a Catalan painter. He is, along with poet Joan Brossa and painters Joan Ponç, his cousin Antoni Tàpies  and Joan-Josep Tharrats, the founder of surrealist et dada review  in 1948.

References

Notes

1925 births
2007 deaths
Artists from Catalonia
Dau al Set
Spanish artists
20th-century Spanish painters
20th-century Spanish male artists
Spanish male painters
Art Informel and Tachisme painters